Vĩnh Bình may refer to several commune-level subdivisions in Vietnam, including:

Vĩnh Bình, Tiền Giang, a township and capital of Gò Công Tây District
Vĩnh Bình, Cần Thơ, a commune of Vĩnh Thạnh District, Cần Thơ
Vĩnh Bình, An Giang, a commune of Châu Thành District, An Giang Province
Vĩnh Bình, Bến Tre, a commune of Chợ Lách District
Vĩnh Bình, Bạc Liêu, a commune of Hòa Bình District
Vĩnh Bình, Long An, a commune of Vĩnh Hưng District

See also
The communes of Vĩnh Bình Bắc and Vĩnh Bình Nam in Vĩnh Thuận District, Kiên Giang Province
Former Vĩnh Bình Province in South Vietnam, now Trà Vinh Province in the Mekong Delta region